Syed Mohammad Noor ur Rahman Barkati is an Indian Muslim cleric who was the Shahi Imam of the West Bengal in Kolkata.

Though he claimed himself to be Shahi Imam (Royal Imam), according to a report of Ebela, he was not so as he did not lead any royal in prayer.

Appointment 
Barkati is the second imam from his family, succeeding his father in 1989.

Controversies 
In March 2010, Barkati was accused of formalising the marriage of a Muslim boy with a transgender girl. Though he admitted the fact, he said the matter was "politically motivated".

Barkati also organised prayers for Osama bin Laden after he was killed by United States in March 2011.

In December 2016, Barkati issued a fatwa against West Bengal Bharatiya Janata Party chief Dilip Ghosh for allegedly giving hate speech against chief minister Mamata Banerjee. In the fatwa, he asked people to stone Ghosh and exile him from the state.

In January 2017, Indian Prime Minister Narendra Modi received a fatwa from Barkati for demonetising 500 and 1000 rupees bank notes. He offered an amount of 25 lakh rupees to someone who would "cut off PM Narendra Modi's beard, shave his head and smear him with black ink". His activity drew criticism with ruling Trinamool Congress MLA Siddiqullah Chowdhury saying that it showed Barkati's immaturity. Jamaat-e-Islami West Bengal secretary Muhammad Nooruddin said that his comments would damage the reputation of Muslims. Former Bharatiya Janata Party state president Rahul Sinha said India was not a place for fatwas.

Barkati said in May that he would beat Muslims who would join Bharatiya Janata Party or Rashtriya Swayamsevak Sangh. He also said that Muslims who said "Jai Shree Ram" (Hindu slogan) were eunuchs. Barkati also warned of waging a jihad if India became a Hindu state.

After the central government passed an order banning the use of red beacons, Barkati refused to remove the beacon from his car, citing that the imams were given right to use the beacon during the British Raj. He finally removed it after a meeting with Trinamool Congress MLA Bobby Hakim.

Barkati has been accused by Bengali newspaper Ebela of trying to illegally occupy the mosque. He has also been criticised for using the mosque premises for press conferences where he gave political messages. He has also been accused of possessing inappropriate wealth.

Sacking 
On 17 May 2017, Barkati was sacked from his post of Shahi Imam. Shahzada Anwar Ali Shah, the president of the trustee board, said that he was sacked because he insulted the religion and the country by making anti national statements. He also said that Barkati was indirectly helping Rashtriya Swayamsevak Sangh to spread in the state.

References 

Islam and politics
Indian imams